Vyacheslav Bogodielov (born 7 October 1969) is a retired Ukrainian football goalkeeper and current goalkeeping coach of Chaika Petropavlivska Borshchahivka.

Biography 
He was born on 7 October 1969 in the family of football player Pavlo Bohodyelov. The pupil of Kiev football schools "Bilshovyk" and "Metalist". He performed in the teams "Nart" Cherkessk, Russia (1992), "Nyva" Ternopil (1992–1994), "Krystal" Chortkiv (1994–1996), FC Oleksandriya (1996–1997), "Krystal" Kherson (1997- 1998), "Metalurh" Donetsk (1998–1999), "Vorskla" Poltava (1998–2000), "Metalist" Kharkiv (2000–2002), "Systema-Boreks" Borodianka (2002–2003), "Polissia" Zhytomyr (2003). Upon termination of career of the player became the football coach. He worked in national junior teams of Ukraine (U16, U17, U18, U19), Dynamo Kyiv, FC Oleksandriya, FC Lviv, FC Nasaf Karshi, FC Volyn Lutsk.

Honours 
 Ukrainian First League bronze medalist (2009, 2010)
 Uzbek League bronze medalist (2010)
 Uzbek League silver medalist (2011)
 Uzbekistan Cup finalist  (2011)
 AFC Cup champion (2011)

References

External links 
  (in Russian)
  (in Russian)

1969 births
Living people
Footballers from Kyiv
Ukrainian footballers
Ukrainian expatriate footballers
Expatriate footballers in Russia
FC Krystal Chortkiv players
FC Nyva Ternopil players
FC Oleksandriya players
FC Krystal Kherson players
FC Metalurh Donetsk players
FC Vorskla Poltava players
FC Vorskla-2 Poltava players
FC Metalist Kharkiv players
FC Metalist-2 Kharkiv players
FC Systema-Boreks Borodianka players
FC Polissya Zhytomyr players
Ukrainian football managers
SC Chaika Petropavlivska Borshchahivka managers
Association football goalkeepers